The ampersand, also known as the and sign, is the logogram , representing the conjunction "and". It originated as a ligature of the letters et—Latin for "and".

Etymology

Traditionally in English, when spelling aloud, any letter that could also be used as a word in itself ("A", "I", and,  "O") was prefixed with the Latin expression  ('by itself'), as in "per se A". It was also common practice to add the  sign at the end of the alphabet as if it were the 27th letter, pronounced as the Latin et or later in English as and. As a result, the recitation of the alphabet would end in "X, Y, Z, and per se and". This last phrase was routinely slurred to "ampersand" and the term had entered common English usage by 1837.

It has been falsely claimed that André-Marie Ampère used the symbol in his widely read publications and that people began calling the new shape "Ampère's and".

History

The ampersand can be traced back to the 1st century A.D. and the old Roman cursive, in which the letters E and T occasionally were written together to form a ligature (Evolution of the ampersand – figure 1). In the later and more flowing New Roman Cursive, ligatures of all kinds were extremely common; figures 2 and 3 from the middle of 4th century are examples of how the et-ligature could look in this script. During the later development of the Latin script leading up to Carolingian minuscule (9th century) the use of ligatures in general diminished. The et-ligature, however, continued to be used and gradually became more stylized and less revealing of its origin (figures 4–6).

The modern italic type ampersand is a kind of "et" ligature that goes back to the cursive scripts developed during the Renaissance. After the advent of printing in Europe in 1455, printers made extensive use of both the italic and Roman ampersands. Since the ampersand's roots go back to Roman times, many languages that use a variation of the Latin alphabet make use of it.

The ampersand often appeared as a character at the end of the Latin alphabet, as for example in Byrhtferð's list of letters from 1011. Similarly,  was regarded as the 27th letter of the English alphabet, as taught to children in the US and elsewhere. An example may be seen in M. B. Moore's 1863 book The Dixie Primer, for the Little Folks. In her 1859 novel Adam Bede, George Eliot refers to this when she makes Jacob Storey say: "He thought it [Z] had only been put to finish off th' alphabet like; though ampusand would ha' done as well, for what he could see." The popular nursery rhyme Apple Pie ABC finishes with the lines "X, Y, Z, and ampersand, All wished for a piece in hand".

Similar characters

In Irish and Scottish Gaelic, the character  is used in place of the ampersand. This character is a survival of Tironian notes, a medieval shorthand system.

The logical conjunction symbol, is often pronounced "and," but is not related to the ampersand.

Writing the ampersand
In everyday handwriting, the ampersand is sometimes simplified in design as a large lowercase epsilon  or a reversed numeral , superimposed by a vertical line. The ampersand is also sometimes shown as an epsilon with a vertical line above and below it or a dot above and below it.

The plus sign  (itself based on an et-ligature) is often informally used in place of an ampersand, sometimes with an added loop and resembling .

Usage
Ampersands are commonly seen in business names formed from a partnership of two or more people, such as Johnson & Johnson, Dolce & Gabbana, Marks & Spencer, and Tiffany & Co., as well as some abbreviations containing the word and, such as AT&T (American Telephone and Telegraph), A&P (supermarkets), P&O (originally "Peninsular and Oriental", shipping and logistics company), R&D (research and development), D&B (drum and bass), D&D (Dungeons & Dragons), R&B (rhythm and blues), B&B (bed and breakfast), and P&L (profit and loss).

In film credits for stories, screenplays, etc., & indicates a closer collaboration than and. The ampersand is used by the Writers Guild of America to denote two writers collaborating on a specific script, rather than one writer rewriting another's work. In screenplays, two authors joined with & collaborated on the script, while two authors joined with and worked on the script at different times and may not have consulted each other at all. In the latter case, they both contributed enough significant material to the screenplay to receive credit but did not work together. As a result, both & and and may appear in the same credit, as appropriate to how the writing proceeded.

In APA style, the ampersand is used when citing sources in text such as (Jones & Jones, 2005). In the list of references, an ampersand precedes the last author's name when there is more than one author. (This does not apply to MLA style, which calls for the "and" to be spelled.)

The phrase  ("and so forth"), usually written as etc. can be abbreviated &c. representing the combination et + c(etera).

The ampersand can be used to indicate that the "and" in a listed item is a part of the item's name and not a separator (e.g. "Rock, pop, rhythm & blues and hip hop").

The ampersand may still be used as an abbreviation for "and" in informal writing regardless of how "and" is used.

Computing

Encoding and display

Apart from this, Unicode also has the following variants:
 
 
 
 
 
 
 
 
 

The last six of these are carryovers from the Wingdings fonts, and are meant only for backward compatibility with those fonts.

On the AZERTY keyboard layout,  is an unmodified keystroke, positioned above .

In URLs, the ampersand must be replaced by %26 when representing a string character to avoid interpretation as a URL syntax character.

Programming languages

In the 20th century, following the development of formal logic, the ampersand became a commonly used logical notation for the binary operator or sentential connective AND. This usage was adopted in computing.

Many languages with syntax derived from C, including C++, Perl, and more differentiate between:
  for bitwise AND.  is zero,  is 4.
  for short-circuit logical AND.  is true.

In C, C++, and Go, a prefix  is a unary operator denoting the address in memory of the argument, e.g. .

In C++ and PHP, unary prefix  before a formal parameter of a function denotes pass-by-reference.

In Fortran, the ampersand forces the compiler to treat two lines as one. This is accomplished by placing an ampersand at the end of the first line and at the beginning of the second line.

In many implementations of ALGOL 60 the ampersand denotes the tens exponent of a real number.

In Common Lisp, the ampersand is the prefix for lambda list keywords.

Ampersand is the string concatenation operator in many BASIC dialects, AppleScript, Lingo, HyperTalk, and FileMaker. In Ada it applies to all one-dimensional arrays, not just strings.

BASIC-PLUS on the DEC PDP-11 uses the ampersand as a short form of the verb .

Applesoft BASIC used the ampersand as an internal command, not intended to be used for general programming, that invoked a machine language program in the computer's ROM.

In some versions of BASIC, unary suffix & denotes a variable is of type long, or 32 bits in length.

(The modern convention is to use "x" as a prefix to denote hexadecimal, thus .) Some other languages, such as the Monitor built into ROM on the Commodore 128, used it to indicate octal instead, a convention that spread throughout the Commodore community and is now used in the VICE emulator.

In MySQL,  has dual roles. As well as a logical AND, it additionally serves as the bitwise operator of an intersection between elements.

Dyalog APL uses ampersand similarly to Unix shells, spawning a separate green thread upon application of a function.

Perl uses the ampersand as a sigil to refer to subroutines:
 In Perl 4 and earlier, it was effectively required to call user-defined subroutines
 In Perl 5, it can still be used to modify the way user-defined subroutines are called
 In Raku (formerly known as Perl 6), the ampersand sigil is only used when referring to a subroutine as an object, never when calling it

In MASM 80x86 Assembly Language,  is the Substitution Operator, which tells the assembler to replace a macro parameter or text macro name with its actual value.

Ampersand is the name of a reactive programming language, which uses relation algebra to specify information systems.

Text markup
The HTML and XML encoding for the ampersand character is the entity . This can create a problem known as delimiter collision when converting text into one of these markup languages. For instance, when putting URLs or other material containing ampersands into XML format files such as RSS files the & must be replaced with &amp; or they are considered not well formed, and computers will be unable to read the files correctly. SGML derived the use from IBM Generalized Markup Language, which was one of many IBM-mainframe languages to use the ampersand to signal a text substitution, eventually going back to System/360 macro assembly language.

In the plain TeX markup language, the ampersand is used to mark tabstops.

In Microsoft Windows menus, labels, and other captions, the ampersand is used to denote the next letter as a keyboard shortcut (called an "Access key" by Microsoft). A double ampersand is needed in order to display a real ampersand. This convention originated in the first WIN32 api, and is used in Windows Forms, (but not WPF, which uses underscore  for this purpose) and is also copied into many other toolkits on multiple operating systems. Sometimes this causes problems similar to other programs that fail to sanitize markup from user input, for instance Navision databases have trouble if this character in either "Text" or "Code" fields.

Unix shells
Some Unix shells use the ampersand as a metacharacter:

Some Unix shells, like the POSIX standard sh shell, use an ampersand to execute a process in the background and to duplicate file descriptors.
 In Bash, the ampersand can separate words, control the command history, duplicate file descriptors, perform logical operations, control jobs, and participate in regular expressions.

Web standards
The generic URL (Uniform Resource Locator) syntax allows for a query string to be appended to a file name in a web address so that additional information can be passed to a script; the question mark, or query mark, is used to indicate the start of a query string. A query string is usually made up of a number of different name–value pairs, each separated by the ampersand symbol, . For example, .

See also
 And (disambiguation)
 List of typographical symbols and punctuation marks
 Kai (abbreviation)
 Heta
 Tironian notes

References

External links

 =
 The Hot Word at Dictionary.com: How ampersand came from a misunderstanding
 "Ask the Editor: Ampersand", video at Merriam-Webster.com (2:01). Retrieved 2013-10-18 
 Font of 52 ampersands, designed by Frederic Goudy

Latin-script letters
Latin-script ligatures
Logic symbols
Typographical symbols
Graphemes
Punctuation